Donax gouldii, common name the bean clam, is a species of small saltwater clam, a marine bivalve mollusk in the family Donacidae.

This species is found on the Pacific coast of North America. This Donax species, known for its periodic population explosions, was eaten by Native Americans in Southern California, particularly the Luiseno and Kumeyaay Indians of San Diego County.

Description
The bean clam may reach one inch in length, and is of varying coloration, often cream, buff, orange or blue and frequently featuring darker rays projecting from the hinge area. The shells are relatively thick, and wedge-shaped, with a polished periostracum. The muscular foot is used by the clam to dig rapidly back into the sand when the clam is exposed by the waves. The bean clam hydroid, Eucheilota bakeri, is often found attached to the posterior end of the shell.

Habitat and range
The Bean clam is found from Pismo Beach, California, to Arroyo del Conejo, Baja California Sur. It inhabits exposed sandy shores from the mid-intertidal zone to waters up to 30 meters deep. It can often be found in profusion at sites such as Redondo Beach, California, and Newport Beach, California.

References

Donacidae